Zoha Rahman is a British-Pakistani actress. She appeared in Spider-Man: Far From Home. Zoha is credited as the first Muslim actor being cast in a Marvel movie.

Early life 
Zoha was born in a small town in Jhelum, Punjab, Pakistan, and moved to the United Kingdom with her family when she was a teenager.

Whilst studying law at university, Zoha accepted various modeling and acting offers while studying, making her film debut in 2019 with Mr. Majnu.

Zoha currently divides her time between the UK and Pakistan, filming movie and television projects in both countries.

Filmography 
As well as appearing in Spider-Man: Far From Home (2019), Zoha has featured in Netflix's Young Wallander as Aaliya, Apple TV's Foundation as the Anacreon soldier Onelle, and has made her Bollywood debut in the cricket epic '83.

Film

Television

Voice acting
Fluent in English, Hindi, Urdu and Punjabi, Zoha works as a voice actor, having lent her voice to multiple commercials in various accents, including for the Home Office. She also narrated Audible's audiobook 'The Arctic Curry Club' by Dani Redd.

References

External links 

21st-century British actresses
British actresses of South Asian descent
Pakistani emigrants to the United Kingdom
British people of Punjabi descent
People from Jhelum District
Living people
Year of birth missing (living people)